Jacques Frantz (4 April 1947 – 17 March 2021) was a French actor. Nominated for the Molière Award, he was renowned for his theatre work, and his voice, which he lent to many actors, such as Robert De Niro, Mel Gibson, John Goodman, and Nick Nolte. Frantz also appeared in films. Since October 2013, he was the official voice of the radio station Nostalgie.

Selected filmography

References

External links
 

1947 births
2021 deaths
French National Academy of Dramatic Arts alumni
French male film actors
French male stage actors
French male television actors
French male voice actors
Actors from Dijon
20th-century French male actors
21st-century French male actors